The 1923 Norwegian Football Cup was the 22nd season of the Norwegian annual knockout football tournament. The tournament was open for all members of NFF. Brann won their first title, having beaten Lyn in the final. Odd were the defending champions, but were eliminated by Lyn in the semifinal.

First round

|}

Second round

|}

Third round

|-
|colspan="3" style="background-color:#97DEFF"|Replay

|}

Fourth round

|-
|colspan="3" style="background-color:#97DEFF"|Replay

|}

Quarter-finals

|}

Semi-finals

|}

Final

See also
1923 in Norwegian football

References

Norwegian Football Cup seasons
Norway
Football Cup